Chicken Inn is a Zimbabwean football club based in Bulawayo. They play in the top division of Zimbabwean football, the Zimbabwe Premier Soccer League.

The team's unusual name comes from its major sponsor, a large Zimbabwean fast food retailer.

History

Having only been formed in 1997, Chicken Inn are a relatively young side in the Zimbabwean Premier Soccer League, and their league title in 2015 was the first in their history following promotion to the top-flight in 2011.

Head coach, Joey Antipas, joined the club in 2013, and has now successfully guided them into the CAF Champions League for the first time in their history after a league campaign that saw them lose just five out of 30 matches.

Honours
 Independence trophy 2016
Zimbabwe Premier Soccer League: Champions:: 2015
NetOne Charity Shield 2013

Current squad

References

External links
 

Association football clubs established in 1997
1997 establishments in Zimbabwe
Sport in Bulawayo
Football clubs in Zimbabwe